Kulari is a village in the Gambia. It is located in tumana District in the Upper River Division. As of the 2013 census, the village had a population of 6,021, up from 3,370 reported in the 2003 census. It is connected by road to Basse Santa Su.

References

Populated places in the Gambia
Upper River Division